The 4th Sustainment Command (Expeditionary) (4th ESC) is a subordinate command of 377th Theater Sustainment Command.  The 4th ESC is located in San Antonio, Texas.  The command comprises 54 subordinate units and has command and control of more than 6,500 Army Reserve soldiers throughout Texas, Oklahoma, Arkansas, and New Mexico. The 4th ESC provides trained and ready forces in support of global contingency operations. On order, the 4th ESC is prepared to deploy and provide command and control to all assigned, attached, and operationally controlled units and will provide sustainment planning, guidance and support to forces in the area of operations.

Mission
Functions as an operational command post for a Theater Sustainment Command (TSC),  providing operational-level sustainment support. Leads, plans, coordinates, synchronizes, monitors, and controls operational-level logistics within an assigned area of operations.

Subordinate Units
As of January 2021 the following units are subordinated to the 4th Sustainment Command (Expeditionary):

 4th Sustainment Command (Expeditionary), at Fort Sam Houston, Texas
 Headquarters and Headquarters Company
 90th Detachment (TM B)
 25th Detachment (TM A)
 644th Transportation Company (Medium Tuck) (PLS)
 Headquarters and Headquarters Company Command
 Headquarters and Headquarters Company Augetee Command
 90th Sustainment Brigade, in Little Rock, Arkansas
 46th Detachment (TM B)
 112th Detachment (TM A)
 315th TM Quartermaster Petrol Liaison
 316th Headquarters and Headquarters Detachment (Petrol)
 316th Quartermaster Battalion
 348th Transportation Battalion
 211th Regional Support Group
 310th Detachment (Petrol Liaison)
 319th Combat Sustainment Support Battalion
 373rd Combat Sustainment Support Battalion
 300th Sustainment Brigade, in Grand Prairie, Texas
 363rd Quartermaster Battalion
 77th Quartermaster Group (Petroleum) at Fort Bliss, TX
 809th Quartermaster Detachment (Petrol Liaison) Kirtland AFB, NM
 372nd Quartermaster Battalion  Kirtland AFB, NM
 Headquarters and Headquarters Detachment (Petrol Liaison)
 877th Quartermaster Company (Petrol Support)
 601st Quartermaster Detachment (Trailer Transfer Point)
 974th Quartermaster Company (Field Services) (MOD)
 383rd Quartermaster Battalion  Fort Bliss, TX
  Headquarters and Headquarters Detachment (Petrol PL & Terminal OP)
 263rd Quartermaster Company (Field Services) (MOD)
 900th Quartermaster Company (Petrol Support)
 356th Quartermaster Company (Medium Truck) (PLS)
 375th Quartermaster Detachment (Trailer Transfer Point)
 985th Quartermaster Detachment (Tactical Water Distribution) (Hoseline)
 471st Quartermaster Detachment (Trailer Transfer Point)
164th Quartermaster Group

History
The 4th ESC has over fifty years of history. The journey began when the unit was constituted on 16 January 1952 as the 4th Logistical Command in the Regular Army as Headquarters and Headquarters Company, 4th Logistical Command. The unit was activated 10 February 1952 at Leghorn, Italy and was inactivated 20 January 1954 at Leghorn, Italy.

Activated 15 June 1958 in France.

Headquarters 4th Logistical Command reorganized and redesignated 24 June 1961 as Headquarters and Headquarters Company, 4th Logistical Command (original Headquarters Company concurrently disbanded).

On 7 May 1964, it was reorganized and redesignated as Headquarters and Headquarters Detachment, 4th Logistical Command, and then was reorganized and redesignated on 24 June 1964 as Headquarters and Headquarters Company, 4th Logistical Command.  It later inactivated on 23 June 1967 at Fort Lee, Virginia.

On 21 December 1975, the unit was redesignated as the 4th Support Center and activated at Fort Hood, Texas.
 
On 1 March 1989, it was redesignated as the 4th Material Management Center Corps Support Command.

On 1 October 2000, it was reorganized and redesignated as the 4th Support Center.  The 4th Support Center was inactivated 15 September 2007 at Fort Hood, Texas.

On 29 November 2007, the unit was withdrawn from the Regular Army and allotted to the Army Reserve.

Redesignated 16 October 2008 as Headquarters and Headquarters Company, 4th Sustainment Command, the unit activated at San Antonio, Texas.

Operation Enduring Freedom
The 4th ESC mobilized in spring of 2011, to support allied operations in Afghanistan.  On 25 July 2011, the unit formally conducted a Transfer of Authority for Joint Sustainment Command - Afghanistan from the 184th ESC.

References

External links 

 

004
004
Military units and formations established in 1952